Antonella Costa (born 19 March 1980 in Rome, Italy) is an Argentine film and television actress. She moved to Argentina with her parents at the age of four. She has worked in different countries, but primarily in Argentine cinema.

Filmography
 Garage Olimpo (1999) a.k.a. Garage Olimpo
 Alma mía (1999)
 El Camino (2000) a.k.a. The Road
 Figli/Hijos (2001) a.k.a. Sons and Daughters
 La Fuga (2001) a.k.a. The Escape
 La Sombra de las luces (2001)
 Pernicioso vegetal (2002)
 Hoy y mañana (2003) a.k.a. Today and Tomorrow
 Nadar solo (2003)
 The Motorcycle Diaries (2004)
 Como un avión estrellado (2005)
 El Viento (2005)
 Tres minutos (2005)
 El Cobrador: In God We Trust (2006)
 No mires para abajo (2008) a.k.a. Don't Look Down
 Mal Día Para Pescar, a.k.a. Bad Day to Go Fishing (2009)
 Felicitas (2009)
 Dry Martina (2018)

Television
 El Hacker (2001) (mini TV Series) a.k.a. The Hacker Mujeres asesinas (2006) TV Episode
 Epitafios 2'' (2009) (mini TV Series)

References

External links

 

1980 births
Argentine film actresses
Living people
Italian emigrants to Argentina